The 1995 All-Ireland Under-21 Hurling Championship was the 32nd staging of the All-Ireland Under-21 Hurling Championship since its establishment by the Gaelic Athletic Association in 1964.

Kilkenny were the defending champions.

On 10 September 1995, Tipperary won the championship following a 1-14 to 1-10 defeat of Kilkenny in the All-Ireland final. This was their 8th All-Ireland title in the under-21 grade and their first in six championship seasons.

Tipperary's Tommy Dunne was the championship's top scorer with 0-34.

Results

Leinster Under-21 Hurling Championship

Quarter-finals

Semi-finals

Final

Munster Under-21 Hurling Championship

Quarter-finals

Semi-finals

Final

All-Ireland Under-21 Hurling Championship

Semi-finals

Final

Championship statistics

Top scorers

Overall

References

Under
All-Ireland Under-21 Hurling Championship